Alejandro "Jandro" Orellana Gómez (born 7 August 2000) is a Spanish footballer who plays as a midfielder for FC Andorra.

Club career
Born in Gavà, Barcelona, Catalonia, Orellana joined FC Barcelona's La Masia in 2014, after representing RCD Espanyol and EF Gavà. He made his senior debut with the reserves on 4 November 2018, coming on as a late substitute for Riqui Puig in a 1–1 Segunda División B home draw against CD Ebro.

Orellana scored his first senior goal on 24 January 2021, netting the opener through a free kick in a 2–1 home win against UE Olot. On 31 August, he renewed his contract with the club for a further year.

On 22 July 2022, free agent Orellana signed a three-year deal with Segunda División newcomers FC Andorra. He made his professional debut on 20 August, replacing Marc Aguado late into a 4–1 away loss against Sporting de Gijón.

References

External links

2000 births
Living people
People from Gavà
Sportspeople from the Province of Barcelona
Spanish footballers
Footballers from Catalonia
Association football midfielders
Segunda División players
Primera Federación players
Segunda División B players
FC Barcelona Atlètic players
FC Andorra players
Spain youth international footballers
Spanish expatriate footballers
Expatriate footballers in Andorra
Spanish expatriate sportspeople in Andorra